Roy Alexander Simmonds (29 December 1928 – 9 August 2008) was an Australian rules footballer who played with Hawthorn in the VFL during the 1950s.

Simmonds was used all around the ground by Hawthorn, most often though on the half back flank. His finest season came in 1956 where he won Hawthorn's best and fairest and finished equal fourth in the Brownlow Medal count. He represented Victoria at the 1956 Perth interstate football carnival.

His career ended when he was controversially omitted from the 1961 Grand Final. 

Simmonds coached Hawthorn for one game in 1973 as regular coach John Kennedy was coaching the Victorian State team. 

In 2003 he was chosen on the interchange bench in Hawthorn's official 'Team of the Century'. 

He worked as a grounds maintenance worker at East Doncaster Secondary in his later life, for a total of fourteen years. On 9 August 2008, Simmonds died from cancer.

Honours and achievements
Individual
 Hawthorn best and fairest: 1956
 Hawthorn life member
 Hawthorn Team of the Century

References

External links

1928 births
2008 deaths
Australian rules footballers from Victoria (Australia)
Hawthorn Football Club players
Hawthorn Football Club coaches
Peter Crimmins Medal winners